William Herschel Sharpe, Jr. (born 1950)was the lead anchor on Charleston, South Carolina broadcast station WCSC-TV. He had been with the station since October 1973.Sharpe retired in 2021 after 48 years at WCSC-TV. He has three children, Hayle Kathryn Sharpe, Harper Daniella-Augusta Sharpe, and William Herschel Sharpe III. He's married to Katherine McGee Thompson Sharpe, and is step father to Grey McGee Thompson, James Hunter Thompson, and Emma Southerland Thompson.

Education
A native of the St. Andrews area in Charleston, he graduated from St. Andrews High School in the city, moving to Atlanta, where he attended Emory University, receiving a degree in English literature with a minor in French.

Awards and recognition
Sharpe has received numerous awards for best newscast for feature reporting and investigative reporting, and has been part of newscasts which received an Emmy and a Peabody Award.  Sharpe's broadcast team received regional Emmy Award nominations in four out of six years between 2002 and 2007.  On a less serious note, Sharpe won a 2008 Best of Charleston award from the Charleston City Paper for "Best Ted Baxter Impression".

Obstruction of justice charge
In 1983, Sharpe and three co-workers were arrested and subsequently cleared of obstruction of justice charges after WCSC-TV broadcast the photograph of a multiple murder suspect against the wishes of law enforcement authorities.  Despite their release, the Charleston County Solicitor refused to acknowledge the validity of the claim that their conduct was protected by the First Amendment.

References

Emory University alumni
Television anchors from Charleston, South Carolina
Living people
1951 births
Regional Emmy Award winners